Living in Oblivion is a 1995 American independent black comedy film, written and directed by Tom DiCillo, and starring Steve Buscemi, Catherine Keener, Dermot Mulroney, Danielle von Zerneck, James LeGros and Peter Dinklage in his film debut. The film won the Waldo Salt Screenwriting Award at the 1995 Sundance Film Festival for DiCillo. It received critical acclaim.

Plot 
The film is divided into three parts, all of which concern the making of a low-budget movie featuring the same director, crew and substantially the same cast.

Part one: Director Nick Reve (Steve Buscemi) is shooting a low-budget independent film in the middle of New York City. The catering crew are under-funded and apathetic, deciding not to replace a carton of milk that has been on the craft service table for a week. The scene being shot is a difficult one; a young woman, Ellen, reproaches her elderly mother (Rica Martens) for not intervening when the father beat Ellen as a child. On the set, just about everything that can go wrong does go wrong; shots are spoiled because of how the mic boom is visible; the camera assistant fails to keep the shot in focus; Cora, the actress playing the mother, forgets her lines and Nicole, the actress playing Ellen, becomes increasingly unfocused and careless. A dispirited Nick calls for a rehearsal without camera to refresh the actors.

When Nicole (Catherine Keener) berates herself for acting badly, Cora (Rica Martens) reassures her with a gesture that reminds Nicole of a similar gesture made by her own terminally ill mother. Nicole is so upset by the memory that she turns in an unexpectedly passionate performance; and Cora, startled by Nicole's sudden intensity, is equally good. Watching them, Nick becomes enthusiastic all over again. Unfortunately, it was not captured on film; cinematographer and camera operator Wolf (Dermot Mulroney), who has been diluting the sub-standard coffee with the spoiled milk, was vomiting in the toilet throughout. Nick ruefully calls for another take. This time, a sudden and insistent beeping sound distracts the actors. Nobody can tell where it's coming from; and Nick flies into a rage, berating everyone on the crew and cast for their inadequacies. He then wakes up in his own bed; the beeping sound was his own alarm clock. He has dreamed the entire segment. It is 4:30 a.m. and he is due on set.

Part two: Early the same morning, the film's lead actor Chad Palomino (James LeGros) is getting dressed in Nicole's hotel room. They have spent the night together, and Chad suggests that they might get together again later; Nicole politely declines. Chad and Nicole arrive on the set separately. Nicole's character Ellen and Chad's character Damian have been in love for years but have never admitted it until the scene being shot on this day. Shooting the scene is made practically impossible by Chad's irregular acting. He keeps changing his mind about where to stand and continually moves to places where he is either invisible or badly lit by scenic light. Nicole becomes increasingly frustrated by Chad's egomania; and, when he starts to stroke her head, she briefly loses her cool, then apologizes. An irritated Chad demands a private talk with Nick. He tells Nick that he has slept with Nicole and makes out that it was she, not he, who had wanted to continue the relationship. Desperate to keep Chad happy, Nick agrees that Nicole is not very good. Nicole overhears this conversation on the sound mixer's headphones. Pretending to be contrite, she asks Nick if they can improvise a little; but, when they do so, she announces to everyone that, although she slept with Chad, she is not at all interested in him. Chad loses his temper and quits the movie.  Relieved that he will no longer have to please Chad, Nick calls him a "Hostess Twinkie motherfucker" and a fight breaks out. Nick beats Chad senseless and fires him. He apologizes to Nicole and confesses that he loves her. They kiss—then Nicole abruptly wakes up, still in her bed, having dreamed the entire segment.

Part three: Later the same day, the crew is setting up for a dream sequence in which Nicole, as Ellen, stands still while a dwarf walks around her holding an apple. Nick claims to have learned a lesson from his own dream: That sometimes, "you just got to roll with things." Nicole admits that she had a dream with Nick in it but doesn't tell him what happened. Nick manages to keep up his positive attitude despite the various mishaps that occur: The smoke machine fails to work, then it catches fire, then his senile mother Cora arrives on the set. However, the ill-tempered dwarf actor Tito (Peter Dinklage) complains that a dwarf in a dream sequence is cliché and walks off the set in disgust. Nick's confidence collapses, and he announces that the movie is over. At that moment, his mother intervenes, grabbing the apple, moving to Tito's mark and announcing that she is "ready". The crew scrambles to shoot the scene, and her manic performance injects fresh energy and conviction into it. Nick is delighted and decides to keep the new dream sequence, and there is a tense moment while the sound mixer records 30 seconds of room tone. The entire cast and crew manages to remain silent, and during this moment they each daydream about different things. They go on to shooting the next sequence.

Cast
 Steve Buscemi as Nick Reve, an intense and hopeful independent film director. Nick is sensitive and thoughtful with actors and he tries to respect the status and dignity of everyone on the set, but sometimes the frustration just gets too much. Nick's surname 'Reve' is derived from and pronounced like the French word rêve, meaning 'dream'.
 Catherine Keener as Nicole, an actress playing the female lead in Nick's film. Nicole is secretly in love with Nick. Although Nick believes she is a fine actress, Nicole herself is fatalistic, believing that she will one day give up acting and seek work as a waitress or short order cook.
 Dermot Mulroney as Wolf, a talented but pretentious and prima donna-ish cinematographer and camera operator. Wolf is in a relationship with the film's First Assistant Director, Wanda (Danielle von Zerneck), although she breaks up with him at the beginning of Part Three. He is opinionated, sulky and obstinate. His surname is Überman, as shown on the clapperboard.
 James LeGros as Chad Palomino, the male lead in Nick's film, a major Hollywood star appearing in a low-budget movie to gain critical kudos. Chad is a selfish egomaniac; all of his suggestions about changing the blocking are in fact covert attempts to place himself in the foreground of the frame, instead of in the background. He turns out to be also a liar, admitting to Nick that he considers him a "loser" and that he only accepted the role "because I thought you were tight with Quentin Tarantino!" This character is sometimes assumed to be based on Brad Pitt, but this isn't the case according to the director on the DVD commentary track.
 Rica Martens as Cora Reve, Nick's Mother, who on set is both a nuisance and a savior.
 Peter Dinklage as Tito, a frustrated dwarf actor who complains about his clichéd roles.
 Michele Carlo as Nurse.

Background
DiCillo got inspiration for the film from the frustrations he experienced when making the film Johnny Suede, and his long struggle to make his next intended film, Box of Moonlight. Living in Oblivion was rejected by all producers, but the actors and friends of the director felt so strongly about the project that they financed it. Two of the producers, Michael Griffiths and Hilary Gilford, were given parts in the movie to thank them for providing finance. Griffiths plays Speedo, the sound mixer; Gilford plays the unnamed Script girl. The film is divided into three parts. The first part was shot in five days and after DiCillo realized that it was too short to be a feature and too long to be a short he expanded it into a full feature film with parts two and three. The film title was taken from the hit 80's song by synth pop artists Anything Box.

Reception
The film was acclaimed by critics. On the website Rotten Tomatoes, it has an approval rating of 86%, based on 36 reviews, with an average rating of 7.7/10. The website's consensus reads, "Living in Oblivion dives into the folly of filmmaking with a sharp satire that sends up indie cinema while working as an entertaining independent picture in its own right."

The film won Tom DiCillo the Waldo Salt Screenwriting Award at the 1995 Sundance Film Festival.

 
American Film Institute recognition:
 AFI's 100 Years... 100 Laughs - Nominated

Home media
 
The 2003 Sony Pictures Home Entertainment release includes a commentary by Tom DiCillo, deleted scenes and an interview with DiCillo and Buscemi. Shout! Factory released a 2-disc set Blu-Ray on November 17, 2015. It is DiCillo's single film to be released on Blu-Ray.

References

External links
 
 
 Living in Oblivion at AllMovie

1995 films
1995 comedy-drama films
American anthology films
American comedy-drama films
American independent films
American satirical films
1990s English-language films
Films about filmmaking
Films about film directors and producers
Films directed by Tom DiCillo
Self-reflexive films
Sony Pictures Classics films
Sundance Film Festival award winners
1990s satirical films
1995 independent films
Films about actors
1990s American films
Films partially in color